Meota is a village in the Canadian province of Saskatchewan within the Rural Municipality of Meota No. 468 and Census Division No. 17. The village name is derived from the Cree phrase Meotate or Mo-Was-In-Ota, meaning "good place to camp" or "it is good here."

Meota is on the south-western shore of Jackfish Lake and is accessed from Highway 26. Meota Regional Park is adjacent to the community.

Demographics 

History 
A post office named Meota was established in 1894, but it was located where the present-day community of Metinota is, leading to some confusion over the origins of the current village of Meota. The first post office in present-day Meota was established in 1910, although it was initially called Beachview.

Joseph A. Dart, an early merchant, had previously established a store in a tent near current-day Meota, and in 1910, he moved to the Meota townsite where his store operated in a building on Main Street. The Canadian Northern Railway opened its line through Meota in 1910–1911. Meota incorporated as a village on July 6, 1911. In 1912 the first grain elevator was constructed, and then a dance pavilion opened in 1921. Other industries included brick manufacturing, a flour mill, and commercial fishing ("Meota Whites"). A series of fires has since decimated the village's business district, and the advent of the automobile caused many local residents to drive to North Battleford for shopping.

See also 

 List of communities in Saskatchewan
 Villages of Saskatchewan

References

Villages in Saskatchewan
Meota No. 468, Saskatchewan
Division No. 17, Saskatchewan
Populated places established in 1894